Northumberland County Council is a unitary authority in North East England. The population of the non-metropolitan unitary authority at the 2011 census was 316,028.

History
It was formed in 1889 as the council for the administrative county of Northumberland. The city of Newcastle upon Tyne was a county borough independent from the county council, although the county council had its meeting place at Moot Hall in the city. Tynemouth subsequently also became a county borough in 1904, removing it from the administrative county. The county was further reformed in 1974, becoming a non-metropolitan county and ceding further territory around the Newcastle conurbation to the new metropolitan county of Tyne and Wear. As part of the 2009 structural changes to local government in England it became a unitary authority with the same boundaries, this disregarded the referendum held in 2005 in which the population voted against the forming of a unitary authority.

Its elections have been in May 2008, 2013, 2017 and 2021 at four-yearly intervals, the expected length of office of each councillor.

Naming of the new unitary authority
Throughout 2008, the people of Northumberland were consulted about the new name of the unitary authority. The choice was between having the name of the incumbent county council as the name for the new unitary authority – Northumberland County Council or whether a brand new name should be given – Northumberland Council. Online polls were held and the votes of staff within the former district councils were collated and overall, the name of the incumbent county council was preferred on a ratio of nearly 2:1.

On 17 December 2008 it was decided that the new name would be Northumberland County Council. The chairman of the council stated that:

Legally, however, the council remains the same body as before, simply assuming the functions of the districts.

Council leadership 
Northumberland appoints a civic head each year, and separately appoints a business chair to preside over council meetings. This differs from most councils where these two ceremonial roles are performed by the same person. The civic head for 2022–2023 is Trevor Cessford, whilst the business chair since 2021 has been Barry Flux, both Conservatives. Political leadership is provided by the leader of the council, being Glen Sanderson since 2020.

Leader of the council and cabinet

Leader of the official opposition and shadow cabinet

Composition

Following the election of 2021, Northumberland County Council the Conservative Party gained majority control of the Council. Following a Liberal Democrat gain in a December 2021 by election, the Conservatives lost majority control.

Other uses

Eurostat statistical area
For Eurostat purposes the area under the jurisdiction of Northumberland County Council is a NUTS 3 region (code UKC21) and is one of six boroughs or unitary districts that comprise the "Northumberland and Tyne and Wear" NUTS 2 region.

Notes

References

External links 
 

Local government in Northumberland
Unitary authority councils of England
Former county councils of England
1889 establishments in England 
2009 establishments in England 
Local education authorities in England
Billing authorities in England
Local authorities in Northumberland
Leader and cabinet executives